The 1922 Phillips Haymakers football team  was an American football team represented Phillips University as a member of the  Oklahoma Intercollegiate Conference during the 1922 college football season. The team's captain was Joe Milam.

Schedule

References

Phillips
Phillips Haymakers football seasons
Phillips Haymakers football